"Fuck It, I Love You" is a song by Scottish singer-songwriter Malcolm Middleton, from his third album, A Brighter Beat. It was his fifth single overall, and his second single from A Brighter Beat, released as "Beep Beep, I Love You" in the UK on 1 April 2007 on Full Time Hobby.

Overview
BigYawn.net comment on the song in their review of A Brighter Beat:

@

Track listing
Songs, music and lyrics by Malcolm Middleton.
7" FTH034
"Beep Beep, I Love You" – 3:46
"Pick Me Up" – 2:48

Personnel
 Malcolm Middleton – vocals, guitar, bass guitar
 Jenny Reeve – vocals
 Tony Doogan – producer

Notes

External links
"Fuck It, I Love You" Lyrics

2007 singles
Malcolm Middleton songs
Songs written by Malcolm Middleton
2007 songs